S.A. Smash was an American hip hop duo from Columbus, Ohio. It consisted of the late Camu Tao and Metro. The duo released the album, Smashy Trashy, on Definitive Jux in 2003.

Discography

Studio albums
 Smashy Trashy (2003)

Singles
 "Last Night" (2003)
 "Gangsta" / "Smash TV" (2003)
 "Illy" / "Niggales Cage" (2003)

Guest appearances
 Vast Aire - "KRS-Lightly" from Look Mom... No Hands (2004)
 Slow Suicide Stimulus - "I.C.U." and "Pop Dat Thing" from Slow Suicide Stimulus (2006)

References

External links
 

Alternative hip hop groups
American hip hop groups
American musical duos
Definitive Jux artists